is the 13th single by Japanese entertainer Akina Nakamori. Written by Reiko Yukawa and Yukihide Takekawa, the single was released on October 9, 1985, by Warner Pioneer through the Reprise label. It was also the second single from her second compilation album Best.

The single became Nakamori's 10th No. 1 on Oricon's weekly singles chart and sold over 335,800 copies.

Track listing 
All music is arranged by Satoshi Nakamura.

Charts

References

External links 
 
 
 

1985 singles
1985 songs
Akina Nakamori songs
Japanese-language songs
Warner Music Japan singles
Reprise Records singles
Oricon Weekly number-one singles